Schinia dobla is a moth of the family Noctuidae. It is found in North America, including Arizona, California and Nevada.

The larvae feed on Ambriosia dumosa.

External links
Images
Butterflies and Moths of North America

Schinia
Moths of North America
Moths described in 1906